The 2023 UEFA Under-19 Futsal Championship (also known as UEFA Under-19 Futsal Euro 2023) will be the third edition of the UEFA Under-19 Futsal Championship, the biennial international youth futsal championship organised by UEFA for the men's under-19 national teams of Europe. The tournament will be held at the Žatika Arena in Poreč, Croatia.

A total of eight teams will play in the final tournament, with players born on or after 1 January 2004 eligible to participate. Spain are the two-time defending champions.

Qualification

Seven teams will qualify to join the hosts in the final tournament. The qualifying draw was held on 3 November 2022. The preliminary round will be held between 17 and 22 January 2023, and the main round will be held between 21 and 26 March 2023.

1 Bold indicates champions for that year. Italic indicates hosts for that year.

References

External links

2023
2022–23 in European futsal
2023 in youth association football
International futsal competitions hosted by Croatia
September 2023 sports events in Europe